The Lichauco Heritage House, formally known as the O'Brien-Lichauco Heritage House is one of the oldest surviving houses in Santa Ana, Manila, Philippines. Originally built in 1859, the house was purchased in the late 1940s by a prominent Filipino lawyer and dignitary, Marcial Lichauco from a European family who had fled the Japanese occupation in the Philippines. The house was declared as a heritage house by the National Historical Commission on July 10, 2010. The Lichauco Heritage house is located along Pedro Gil Street. It is the only declared Heritage House in Santa Ana, and one of the only two declared heritage houses in Metro Manila along with Mira-Nila House in Quezon City.

History 
Initial surveys of the house indicate that it was constructed during the 1850-1860s during the late Spanish period. It was deliberately constructed facing the  Pasig River because at the time, the river was an avenue for a flourishing market and a major transport route for visitors travelling in Manila.

Prior to World War II, the house was owned by the O'Brien family who fled Manila when Japanese troops invaded the capital. Unlike the other towns in Manila, Santa Ana was spared from much of the destruction. Because of its location on a main thoroughfare leading out of Manila, the house became a place of refuge for those fleeing the destruction downtown.

Following the Allied liberation of Manila,  Marcial Lichauco bought the house from the O'Briens. In recent years, the house has become an important remnant of Santa Ana's rich history when at June 10, 2010, it was declared to be the first heritage house by the virtue of Resolution 5 by the National Historical Commission.

Architecture and style 

In a style reminiscent of the Bahay na Bato of pre-1860s heavily influenced by Spanish-style architecture, concrete materials are used on the ground floor, varnished wood on the second floor, and  capiz for windows and other decorations. The house retains its original materials and architecture, including the molave stairs, the adobe walls, the wooden panels and the machuca tiles. It has a spacious second floor to accommodate social gatherings. A row thick, plaster-coated Tuscan columns supports the veranda on the side facing the Pasig River. The house faces the Pasig River because at the time it was built, most guests arrived by boat.

Standing in front of the house is a 200-year-old balete tree (strangler fig). This tree was declared by the Department of Environment and Natural Resources as the second heritage tree within City of Manila. The Lichauco balete tree is the eighth Heritage Tree proclaimed in Metro Manila, However, it is the first heritage tree to be declared inside a residential compound.

See also 
 Historic houses in Santa Ana, Manila

References

External links 

Houses in Metro Manila
Cultural Properties of the Philippines in Metro Manila
Heritage Houses in the Philippines
Buildings and structures in Santa Ana, Manila
Houses completed in 1859